Modern Medicine was the title of a group exhibition of contemporary art on display in "Building One"—one of the buildings comprising the former Peek Frean biscuit factory—in Bermondsey, London, in 1990. The exhibition was organized or "curated" by Billee Sellman, Damien Hirst and Carl Freedman. The exhibition included the first showing of Damien Hirst's sculpture "One Thousand Years". It was one of several warehouse exhibitions from which the YBA art scene developed—along with Freeze and East Country Yard.

Exhibited artists

 Mat Collishaw
 Grainne Cullen
 Dominic Denis
 Angus Fairhurst
 Damien Hirst
 Abigail Lane
 Miriam Lloyd
 Craig Wood
 Dan Bonsall

References

Contemporary art exhibitions
Young British Artists
Art exhibitions in London
1990 in art
1990 in London